Elizaveta Chesnokova (born  in Tryokhgorny) is a Russian freestyle skier, specializing in halfpipe and slopestyle.

Chesnokova competed at the 2014 Winter Olympics for Russia. She placed 19th in the qualifying round in the halfpipe, failing to advance.

As of September 2015, her best showing at the World Championships is 12th, in the 2015 halfpipe.

Chesnokova made her World Cup debut in January 2013. As of September 2015, her best World Cup finish is 11th, in at Calgary in 2013–14. Her best World Cup overall finish in halfpipe is 19th, in 2013–14.

References

1996 births
Living people
Olympic freestyle skiers of Russia
Freestyle skiers at the 2014 Winter Olympics
People from Tryokhgorny
Russian female freestyle skiers
Universiade silver medalists for Russia
Universiade medalists in freestyle skiing
Competitors at the 2015 Winter Universiade
Sportspeople from Chelyabinsk Oblast